Margaret Alison Cameron AM, FRAOU (born 1937) is a noted Australian librarian, administrator, and amateur ornithologist. She was the foundation librarian of Deakin University between 1977 and 1996, and pro vice-chancellor of the University from 1986 to 1990. She joined the Royal Australasian Ornithologists Union (RAOU) in 1969 which she served as President from 1986 to 1989.

Personal life 
Cameron was born in Queensland Australia on 10 September 1937. As a child, her interest in birds was fostered by her father and life in the country. However, this initial interest remained dormant until opportunities through becoming a librarian for Flinders University arose for field trips and educational lectures that a deeper passion for birding and conservation was sparked. Following her stint at Flinders, Cameron moved on to  Macquarie University from 1969 to 1977. It was here that she honed her skills in field ornithology, and inspired other birders with her enthusiasm and enquiring mind.

Career 
Cameron began her career as a librarian at the Public Library of Queensland from 1959-1962. She spent the following year in the United States of America at the Australian Reference Library in New York. She returned to Australia in 1964 to be Thatcher Librarian at the University of Queensland. From 1965-1969 she worked at Flinders University. Following this, she moved to New South Wales to be a Reader Services Librarian at Macquarie University where she stayed until 1977.

Awards and recognition 
Cameron was appointed a Member of the Order of Australia in 1990 for "service to library services, education and to ornithology". In 1993 she was elected a Fellow of the RAOU. In 1999 she received an honorary Doctor of the University from Deakin University. Margaret was the recipient of an Australian American Education Foundation (Fulbright) University Administrator Grant as well as a British Council Cultural Visitor.

References 

Anon. (1993). RAOU Fellow: Citation. Margaret Alison Cameron. Emu 93: 299.
Robin, Libby. (2001). The Flight of the Emu: a hundred years of Australian ornithology 1901-2001. Carlton, Vic. Melbourne University Press. 

Australian ornithologists
Women ornithologists
Members of the Order of Australia
1937 births
Living people

Australian librarians
Australian women librarians
People educated at St Margaret's Anglican Girls' School